NEG or neg is an abbreviation that may refer to:

 the IATA code for Negril Aerodrome in Jamaica
 Net energy gain
 Non-evaporable getter,  in vacuum technology
 Negative (disambiguation)
 Negging, the giving of a backhanded compliment
 NEG Micon, now part of Vestas
 Nippon Electric Glass, a Japanese manufacturer
 National Energy Guarantee, Australia
 Neg Dupree, of Neg's Urban Sports